Jonathan Bruce Goddard (May 11, 1981 – June 15, 2008) was an American defensive end in the National Football League and Arena Football League. He was drafted by the Detroit Lions and also spent time with the Indianapolis Colts and Colorado Crush before his death in a June 2008 motorcycle accident.

Early years
Goddard was born in San Diego, California, and attended Edward H. White High School in Jacksonville, Florida.

College career
Goddard attended Marshall University, where he played for the Thundering Herd and was an All-America selection.

His senior season statistics include 78 tackles, 16 sacks, 28 tackles for loss, 5 broken up passes, 5 forced fumbles, and 3 quarterback hurries. He was runner-up in the Bronko Nagurski Trophy standings.

Professional career

Detroit Lions
Goddard was drafted by the Detroit Lions in the sixth round (206th overall) of the 2005 NFL Draft with a pick acquired from the New England Patriots. He was signed to a three-year contract on July 15 and assigned No. 99. However, injuries plagued him during the 2005 preseason and he was released by the team on September 3.

Indianapolis Colts
Following his release from the Lions, Goddard was signed to the practice squad by the Indianapolis Colts on September 14. He was promoted to the active roster on January 1, 2006 and made his NFL debut the same day against the Arizona Cardinals. Goddard recorded one solo tackle in the Colts' 17-13 victory. He was inactive during the team's divisional round loss to the Pittsburgh Steelers.

On August 20, 2006, Goddard suffered a foot injury in a preseason game against the Seattle Seahawks. He was placed on season-ending injured reserve three days later.

Colorado Crush
Goddard was signed by the Colorado Crush of the Arena Football League on May 6, 2008. He appeared in two games for the team, recording one assisted tackle and breaking up a pass. He was waived by the team on June 4.

Death
Goddard died on June 15, 2008, from injuries suffered in a motorcycle accident in northern Florida. According to reports, Goddard's motorcycle went off the shoulder of a road at high speed and overturned at approximately 7:40 p.m. in Clay County.

References

External links
 Colorado Crush bio
 Indianapolis Colts bio

1981 births
2008 deaths
American football defensive ends
American football linebackers
Detroit Lions players
Indianapolis Colts players
Colorado Crush players
Marshall Thundering Herd football players
Players of American football from Jacksonville, Florida
Motorcycle road incident deaths
Players of American football from San Diego
Road incident deaths in Florida